Michele Scartezzini (born 10 January 1992) is an Italian road and track cyclist, who currently competes for UCI Continental team . He has competed at the UCI Track Cycling World Championships, since 2011, winning a silver medal in the scratch race in 2018 and bronze medals in the team pursuit in 2017 and 2020.

Major results

2012
 3rd  Team pursuit, UEC European Track Championships
 6th Coppa della Pace
2013
 1st Trofeo Piva
 4th Trofeo Edil C
2014
 7th Trofeo Banca Popolare di Vicenza
 8th Overall Tour of China I
 8th Gran Premio Palio del Recioto
2015
 3rd Memorial Denis Zanette e Daniele Del Ben
 7th GP Adria Mobil
 8th Trofeo Matteotti
2016
 1st Six Days of Fiorenzuola (with Elia Viviani)
 2nd  Team pursuit, UEC European Track Championships
 6th Trofeo Edil C
 10th Circuito del Porto
2017
 2nd  Team pursuit, UEC European Track Championships
 3rd  Team pursuit, UCI Track World Championships
2018
 1st  Team pursuit, UEC European Track Championships
 2nd  Scratch race, UCI Track World Championships
2019
 UEC European Track Championships
2nd  Team pursuit
3rd  Points race
2020
 3rd  Team pursuit, UCI Track World Championships
2021
 2nd  Madison (with Simone Consonni), UCI Track World Championships
2022
 UCI Track Nations Cup, Cali
1st  Madison (with Francesco Lamon)
1st  Team pursuit

References

External links

1992 births
Living people
Italian track cyclists
Italian male cyclists
European Championships (multi-sport event) gold medalists
Cyclists from the Province of Verona